Melanoplus forcipatus is a species of grasshopper in the subfamily Melanoplinae ("spur-throated grasshoppers"), in the family Acrididae ("short-horned grasshoppers"). The species is known generally as the "toothcercus shortwing grasshopper" or "broad cercus scrub grasshopper".
It is found in North America.

References

Further reading
 
 Capinera J.L, Scott R.D., Walker T.J. (2004). Field Guide to Grasshoppers, Katydids, and Crickets of the United States. Cornell University Press.
 Otte, Daniel (1995). "Grasshoppers [Acridomorpha] C". Orthoptera Species File 4, 518.

Melanoplinae